Clyde Robert Laidlaw (born 27 November 1933) is a former Australian rules footballer who played for Melbourne in the Victorian Football League (VFL).

Football
Clyde Laidlaw was a midfielder in his four winning Grand Finals in 1955, 1956, 1959 and 1960. Business commitments restricted Laidlaw to just six games in 1957, with a thigh injury sidelining him from the finals series.

Footnotes

References
Piesse, Ken (1993). The Complete Guide to Australian Football. Melbourne: Pan MacMillan Australia Pty Limited.

External links
 
 Clyde Laidlaw, at Demonwiki.
 

1933 births
Living people
Melbourne Football Club players
Portland Football Club players
Australian rules footballers from Victoria (Australia)
Four-time VFL/AFL Premiership players
Melbourne Football Club Premiership players